Thaddeus Peplowski (Tadeusz Stanisław Pepłowski, November 4, 1936 - January 19, 2018) was bishop of the Buffalo-Pittsburgh Diocese of Polish National Catholic Church from 1990 to 2012. He was born in Albany, New York and attended Savonarola Theological Seminary. He was ordained to the priesthood on November 11, 1964, and consecrated on November 30, 1990. Bishop Peplowski was active in the formation of the Nordic Catholic Church and in PNCC theological dialogue with the Orthodox Church and the Roman Catholic Church.

External links 
Grave
Joyfully Remembered, Already Missed!
Bishop Thaddeus Peplowski in Memoriam

American bishops
American Polish National Catholics
Bishops of the Polish National Catholic Church
American people of Polish descent
1936 births
2018 deaths
20th-century American clergy
21st-century American clergy